NETD, NetD or netd can refer to:

 Negative electron-transfer dissociation
 Noise equivalent temperature difference
 NetDetector from Niksun
 Network device (NetD)
 netd.com a VOD service in Turkey by Doğan Media Group